Sir Christopher Collett, GBE (10 June 1931 – 2 December 2012) was a British accountant. He was Lord Mayor of London from 1988 to 1989.

Biography 
Collett was educated at Harrow and Emmanuel College, Cambridge. He was a partner in Ernst & Young.

References 
 Who Was Who

1931 births
2012 deaths
Knights Grand Cross of the Order of the British Empire
People educated at Harrow School
Alumni of Emmanuel College, Cambridge
British accountants
20th-century lord mayors of London
20th-century British businesspeople